Articles related to the Canadian province of Newfoundland and Labrador include:

A 
 L'Anse aux Meadows
 Architecture of St. John's, Newfoundland and Labrador
 Area code 709
 Art of Newfoundland and Labrador
 Atlantic Provinces Economic Council
 Atlantica
 Auditor General of Newfoundland and Labrador
 Avalon Peninsula

B 
 Battle of Placentia (1692)
 Bonavista Peninsula
 Burin Peninsula
 Broadcasting Corporation of Newfoundland

C 
 Canada–France Maritime Boundary Case
 Census divisions of Newfoundland and Labrador
 Central Labrador
 Centre for Newfoundland Studies
 Cod fishing in Newfoundland
 Collapse of the Atlantic northwest cod fishery
 Confederation Building (Newfoundland and Labrador)

D 
 Demographics of Newfoundland and Labrador
 Department of Advanced Education and Skills (Newfoundland and Labrador)
 Department of Child, Youth and Family Services (Newfoundland and Labrador)
 Department of Innovation, Business and Rural Development (Newfoundland and Labrador)
 Department of Natural Resources (Newfoundland and Labrador)
 Diocese of Central Newfoundland
 Diocese of Eastern Newfoundland and Labrador
 Diocese of Western Newfoundland

E 
 Elections in Newfoundland and Labrador
 Elections Newfoundland and Labrador
 Encyclopedia of Newfoundland and Labrador
 Executive Council of Newfoundland and Labrador

F 
 Franco-Newfoundlander

G 
 Geography of Newfoundland and Labrador
 Geological Survey of Newfoundland and Labrador
 Grand Banks
 Great Northern Peninsula
 Gros Morne National Park

H 
 Heritage Foundation of Newfoundland and Labrador
 History of Basque whaling
 History of Newfoundland and Labrador
 History of the petroleum industry in Canada (frontier exploration and development)

I 
 Indian Bay (Newfoundland and Labrador)
 Ireland Newfoundland Partnership
 Irish language in Newfoundland
 Irish Newfoundlanders

J 
J.T. Cheeseman Provincial Park

K 
King's Cove
Kippens, Newfoundland and Labrador

L 
 Labrador Peninsula
 Labrador West, Newfoundland and Labrador
 Lieutenant Governor of Newfoundland and Labrador
 List of airlines of Newfoundland and Labrador
 List of airports in Newfoundland and Labrador
 List of birds of Newfoundland and Labrador
 List of census agglomerations in Newfoundland and Labrador
 List of census divisions of Newfoundland and Labrador
 List of colleges in Newfoundland and Labrador
 List of communities in Newfoundland and Labrador
 List of curling clubs in Newfoundland and Labrador
 List of designated places in Newfoundland and Labrador
 List of fossiliferous stratigraphic units in Newfoundland and Labrador
 List of generating stations in Newfoundland and Labrador
 List of ghost towns in Newfoundland and Labrador
 List of historic places in Newfoundland and Labrador
 List of historic places in Labrador
 List of islands of Newfoundland and Labrador
 List of lakes of Newfoundland and Labrador
 List of lighthouses in Newfoundland and Labrador
 List of National Historic Sites of Canada in Newfoundland and Labrador
 List of Newfoundland and Labrador by-elections
 List of Newfoundland and Labrador general elections
 List of Newfoundland and Labrador highways
 List of Newfoundland and Labrador lieutenant-governors
 List of Newfoundland and Labrador parks
 List of Newfoundland and Labrador premiers
 List of Newfoundland and Labrador provincial highways
 List of Newfoundland and Labrador rivers
 List of mammals of Newfoundland
 List of mountains of Newfoundland and Labrador
 List of municipalities in Newfoundland and Labrador
 List of museums in Newfoundland and Labrador
 List of political parties in Newfoundland and Labrador
 List of population centres in Newfoundland and Labrador
 List of premiers of Newfoundland and Labrador
 List of protected areas of Newfoundland and Labrador
 List of radio stations in Newfoundland and Labrador
 List of rivers of Newfoundland and Labrador
 List of television stations in Newfoundland and Labrador
 List of towns in Newfoundland and Labrador
 List of villages in Newfoundland and Labrador

M 
 Maritime Union
 Memorial Day (Newfoundland and Labrador)
 Migratory Fishery of Labrador
 Mistaken Point Ecological Reserve
 Monarchy in Newfoundland and Labrador
 Mushuau Innu First Nation
 Music of Newfoundland and Labrador

N 
 National War Memorial (Newfoundland)
 Newfoundland (island)
 Newfoundland and Labrador Court of Appeal
 Newfoundland and Labrador Federation of Labour
 Newfoundland and Labrador House of Assembly
 Newfoundland and Labrador Hydro
 Newfoundland and Labrador Medical Association
 Newfoundland and Labrador Soccer Association
 Newfoundland and Labrador Youth Parliament
 Newfoundland Campaign (1744)
 Newfoundland dog
 Newfoundland English
 Newfoundland French
 Newfoundland Highland forests
 Newfoundland Irish
 Newfoundland outport
 Newfoundland Railway
 Newfoundland Ranger Force
 Newfoundland Rugby Union
 Newfoundland School Society
 Newfie
 NunatuKavut people
 Nunatsiavut
 Nunatukavut

O 
 "Ode to Newfoundland"
 Order of Newfoundland and Labrador

P 
 Joseph De la Penha
 Politics of Newfoundland and Labrador
 Port Hope Simpson
 Premier of Newfoundland and Labrador
 Province of Avalon
 Provincial Court of Newfoundland and Labrador

Q 
 Qalipu Mi'kmaq First Nation Band

R 
 Research & Development Corporation Newfoundland and Labrador
 Roads in Newfoundland and Labrador
 Roman Catholic Archdiocese of St. John's, Newfoundland
 Roman Catholic Diocese of Corner Brook and Labrador
 Roman Catholic Diocese of Grand Falls
 The Rooms
 Royal Newfoundland Constabulary

S 
 Same-sex marriage in Newfoundland and Labrador
 Scouting in Newfoundland and Labrador
 Seal hunting
 South Falkland
 Speaker of the House of Assembly of Newfoundland and Labrador
 Supreme Court of Newfoundland and Labrador
 Supreme Court of Newfoundland and Labrador (Court of Appeal)
 Symbols of Newfoundland and Labrador

T 
 Telecommunications in Newfoundland and Labrador
 Trans-Labrador Highway
 Turbot War

U 
 Upper Island Cove, Newfoundland and Labrador

V 
 Vehicle registration plates of Newfoundland and Labrador

W 
Witless Bay Ecological Reserve

X

Y 
 York Harbour, Newfoundland and Labrador

Z

See also

Index of Canada-related articles

Newfoundland and Labrador